The women's snowboard cross competition of the 2014 Winter Paralympics was held at Rosa Khutor Extreme Park near Krasnaya Polyana, Russia on 14 March 2014. It made its Winter Paralympics debut. The only classification taking part in this event were the standing athletes.

Results
Each athlete will race the course 3 times and their top 2 times will be added together to get the total time.

See also
Alpine skiing at the 2014 Winter Olympics

References

Women's snowboard cross
Para